The higher-level classification of the insect order Diptera is in a constant state of flux, and over the last several decades, a vast number of names have been variously proposed, rejected, had their definitions changed, or altered spelling. Keeping track of all of these names is a challenging task, especially as there is no consensus as to the proper classification that should be used for this order, as well as reflecting a more fundamental challenge to the entire underlying principles of classification, which is especially evident among Dipteran systematists. The purpose of this article is to serve as a reference in situations where a reader may encounter an obsolete name in a printed or online resource, and otherwise be unable to find it.

Secondarily, this list also contains names referring to fossil taxa, whose placement into modern classifications is generally untenable, as classifications increasingly rely on molecular phylogenetics, which excludes fossils from consideration.

Family names in Nematocera
Families in the list below marked with a plus sign are extinct.

+Ansorgiidae
+Antefungivoridae
Baenotidae - rank (genus) in Cecidomyiidae
+Boholdoyidae
Cecidomyidae - misspelling for Cecidomyiidae
Cramptonomyiidae - rank in Pachyneuridae
+Crosaphididae
+Dixamimidae -  extinct (Middle Jurassic) rank in Chaoboridae
+Elliidae
+Gracilitipulidae
+Grauvogeliidae
+Hennigmatidae
Hyperoscelididae - rank in Canthyloscelidae
Leptoconopidae - rank in Ceratopogonidae
Lestremiidae - rank in Cecidomyiidae
+Limnorhyphidae
+Luanpingitidae
Macroceridae - rank in Keroplatidae
+Mesosciophilidae
Mycetobiidae - rank in Anisopodidae
+Nadipteridae
Nemopalpidae - rank in Psychodidae
Olbiogastridae - rank in Anisopodidae
+Oreodomyiidae
Orphnephilidae - rank in Thaumaleidae
+Parapleciidae
Penthrediidae - rank in Bibionidae
Phlebotomidae - rank in Psychodidae
+Phragmoligoneuridae - synonym for +Protopliciidae
Pleciidae - rank in Bibionidae
+Procramptonomyiidae
+Protopliciidae
+Rhaetomyiidae extinct (Upper Triassic) rank in Chaoboridae
Rhyphidae - rank in Anisopodidae
+Serendipidae
+Siberhyphidae
+Sinotendipedidae
Synneuridae - rank in Canthyloscelidae
+Zhangobiidae

Family names in Brachycera

Non-cyclorrhaphan Brachycera
Acanthomeridae - rank in Pantophthalmidae
+Alinkidae - extinct (Triassic) 
+Archisargidae - extinct (Middle Jurassic) 
Coenomyiidae - rank in Xylophagidae
Cyrtosiidae - rank in Mythicomyiidae
+Eomyiidae - extinct (Middle Jurassic) 
+Eostratiomyiidae - extinct (Middle Jurassic) 
+Eremochaetidae - extinct (Cretaceous, Jurassic) 
Exeretonevridae - rank in Xylophagidae
Glutopidae - rank in Pelecorhychidae
Heterostomidae - rank in Xylophagidae
Microphoridae - rank in Dolichopodidae
Mydaidae - misspelling of Mydidae
+Palaeostratiomyiidae - extinct (Middle Jurassic) rank in Rhagionidae
+Protempididae - extinct (Upper Jurassic)
+Protobrachycerontidae - extinct (Lower Jurassic) rank in Vermileonidae
+Protocyrtidae - extinct (Middle Jurassic) rank in Heloridae, Hymenoptera - originally misidentified as Diptera
+Protomphralidae - extinct (Middle Jurassic) 
Rachiceridae - rank in Xylophagidae
+Rhagionempididae - extinct (Middle Jurassic) 
Solvidae - rank in Xylomyidae
Stratiomyiidae - misspelling for Stratiomyidae
Systropodidae - rank in Bombyliidae
Usiidae - rank in Bombyliidae

Cyclorrhapha - Aschiza
Aenigmatiidae - rank in Phoridae
Microdontidae - rank in Syrphidae
Sciadoceridae - rank in Phoridae
Termitoxeniidae - rank in Phoridae
Thaumatoxenidae - rank in Phoridae

Cyclorrhapha - Acalyptratae
Borboridae - synonym for Sphaeroceridae
Borboropsidae - rank in Heleomyzidae
Calobatidae - rank in Micropezidae
Campichoetidae - rank in Diastatidae
Canaceidae - misspelling of Canacidae
Centrioncidae - rank in Diopsidae
Chiropteromyzidae - rank in Heleomyzidae
Cnemospathidae - rank in Heleomyzidae
Cremifaniidae - rank in Chamaemyiidae
Cypselidae - synonym for Sphaeroceridae
Diopseidae - misspelling of Diopsidae
Eurychoromyiidae rank in Lauxaniidae
Eurygnathomyidae - rank in Pallopteridae
Euxestidae - rank in Ulidiidae
Heteromyzidae - rank in Heleomyzidae
Mindidae - synonym for Chloropidae
Neottiophilidae - rank in Piophilidae
Notomyzidae - rank in Heleomyzidae
Otitidae - rank in Ulidiidae
Phycodromidae - synonym for Coelopidae
Proneottiophilidae - rank in Psilidae
Pterocallidae - rank in Ulidiidae
Rhinotoridae - rank in Heleomyzidae
Rhopalomeridae - misspelling of Ropalomeridae
Risidae - rank in Ephydridae
Sapromyzidae - rank in Lauxaniidae
Sepsididae - misspelling of Sepsidae
Siphonellopsidae - rank in Chloropidae
Stenomicridae - rank in Persicelididae
Strongylophthalmidae - misspelling of Strongylophthalmyiidae
Strongylophthalmyiidae - rank in Tanypezidae
Stylogastridae (or Stylogasteridae) - rank in Conopidae
Taeniapteridae - rank in Micropezidae
Tetanoceridae - rank in Sciomyzidae
Thyreophoridae - rank in Piophilidae
Trixoscelididae - rank in Heleomyzidae
Trypetidae - rank in Tephritidae
Tunisimyiidae - rank in Xenasteiidae
Tylidae - rank in Micropezidae

Cyclorrhapha - Calyptratae
Acridomyiidae - rank in Anthomyiidae
Anthomylidae (or Anthomyidae) - misspelling of Anthomyiidae
Axiniidae - rank in Rhinophoridae
Cordyluridae - rank in Scathophagidae
Cuterebridae - rank in Oestridae
Dexiidae - rank in Tachinidae
Eginiidae - rank in Muscidae
Gastrophilidae - rank in Oestridae
Hypodermatidae - rank in Oestridae
Leucostomatidae - rank in Sarcophagidae
Mesembrinellidae - rank in Calliphoridae
Phasiidae - rank in Tachinidae
Scatophagidae - misspelling of Scathophagidae; Scatophagidae is a family of fish
Stackelbergomyiidae - rank in Tachinidae
Villeneuviellidae - rank in Calliphoridae

Higher level invalid names
Anthomyiidea - superfamily, now in Muscoidea
Asilidea - rank in Asiloidea
Bibionidea - rank in infraorder Culicomorpha
Bolitophilidea - invalid superfamily in Bibionomorpha
Bombyliidea - rank in Asiloidea
Borboridea - rank in family Stratiomyomorpha
Braulomorpha - infraorder, now in superfamily Carnoidea
Chironomidea - rank in infraorder Culicomorpha
Chloropidea - superfamily, now in Carnoidea
Conopidea - rank in Conopoidea
Culicidea - rank in infraorder Culicomorpha
Culicimorpha - misspelling? of Culicomorpha
Dixidea - rank in infraorder Culicomorpha
Drosophiloidea - superfamily, roughly equivalent to Ephydroidea
Empididea - rank in Empidoidea
Gastrophilidea - rank in family Oestridae
Glossinidea - rank in superfamily Hippoboscoidea
Heleomyzidea - superfamily, redistributed to Sphaeroceroidea, Sciomyzoidea and Opomyzoidea
Hippoboscidea - rank in superfamily Hippoboscoidea
Mesophantasmatidea - rank in infraorder Culicomorpha
Muscidea - rank in superfamily Muscoidea
Musidoromorpha - rank in superfamily Platypezoidea
Myiomorpha - infraorder, roughly equivalent to Cyclorrhapha
Nycteribiomorpha - rank in superfamily Hippoboscoidea
Oestridea - rank in superfamily Oestroidea
Orphnephilidea - rank in infraorder Culicomorpha
Pachyneuridea - invalid superfamily in Bibionomorpha
Phoromorpha - rank in superfamily Platypezoidea
Phragmoligoneuridea - extinct rank in infraorder Culicomorpha
Platypezidea - rank in superfamily Platypezoidea
Psilidea - superfamily, redistributed to Diopsoidea and Nerioidea
Pupipara - archaic equivalent of superfamily Hippoboscoidea
Rhaetomyiidea - rank in infraorder Culicomorpha
Rhyphidea - rank in infraorder Bibionomorpha
Sapromyzidea - superfamily, redistributed between Lauxanioidea and Tephritoidea
Sarcophagidea - rank in superfamily Oestroidea
Somatiidea - superfamily, now in Diopsoidea
Stratiomyidea - synonym for superfamily Stratiomyomorpha
Streblomorpha - rank in superfamily Hippoboscoidea
Syrphidea - rank in superfamily Syrphoidea
Tabanidea - synonym for superfamily Tabanomorpha
Tachinidea - rank in superfamily Oestroidea
Termitoxeniomorpha - rank in superfamily Platypezoidea
Trypetidea - superfamily, now in superfamily Tephritoidea

References

Curtis Williams Sabrosky Family group names in the Diptera and Bibliography downloadable pdf

External links
The Diptera Site
Congruence and Controversy Phylogeny of Diptera

z
Obsolete arthropod taxa